Francis Pélissier (13 June 1894 – 22 February 1959) was a French professional road racing cyclist from Paris. He was the younger brother of Tour de France winner Henri Pélissier, and the older brother of Tour de France stage winner Charles Pélissier. He won several classic cycle races like Paris–Tours, Bordeaux–Paris and Grand Prix Wolber. He also won the French National Road Race Championship three times (1921, 1923 and 1924) as well as two stages at the Tour de France.

Major results

1919
Tour de France:
Winner stage 3
Nancy-Brussels
1920
Tour du Sud-Est
1921
Circuit Aisne-Oise
 national road race champion
Paris–Tours
1922
Bordeaux–Paris
1923
 national road race champion
1924
 national road race champion
Bordeaux–Paris
Vuelta Ciclista al País Vasco
1926
GP Wolber
Critérium des As
Critérium International de Cyclo-cross, Cyclo-cross
1927
Tour de France:
Winner stage 1
Wearing yellow jersey for five days

See also
 List of doping cases in cycling

External links

1894 births
1959 deaths
Cyclists from Paris
French male cyclists
French Tour de France stage winners
Doping cases in cycling